Ronald Wayne Walker (born December 27, 1966) is a former American professional football player who was a wide receiver in the National Football League (NFL), World League of American Football (WLAF), Canadian Football League (CFL) and Arena Football League (AFL). He played for the San Diego Chargers of the NFL, the San Antonio Riders of the WLAF, the Ottawa Rough Riders and Shreveport Pirates of the CFL, and the Tampa Bay Storm of the AFL. Walker played collegiately at Texas Tech University.

References

1966 births
Living people
American football wide receivers
American players of Canadian football
Canadian football wide receivers
Minnesota Vikings players
Ottawa Rough Riders players
Sportspeople from Waco, Texas
Players of American football from Texas
San Antonio Riders players
Shreveport Pirates players
Tampa Bay Storm players
Texas Tech Red Raiders football players